White Hall, Northern Ireland or Gortamaddy is a townland in County Antrim, Northern Ireland.

See also 
List of townlands in County Antrim
List of places in County Antrim

References

Townlands of County Antrim